Changde Taohuayuan Airport  is an airport in Changde, a city in the Hunan province of China.

Airlines and destinations

See also
List of airports in China

References

External links
 
 

Airports in Hunan
Changde
Transport in Changde